Francesc "Xesc" Regis Crespí (born 30 September 1996) is a Spanish professional footballer who plays for Greek Super League club Asteras Tripolis as a forward.

Club career
Regis was born in Palma, Majorca, Balearic Islands, and was a RCD Mallorca youth graduate. In 2015 he was loaned to Segunda División B side CD Llosetense, and made his senior debut on 23 August of that year by coming on as a late substitute in a 1–1 home draw against Valencia CF Mestalla.

Regis scored his first senior goal on 17 January 2016, netting the equalizer in a 3–1 home win against Levante UD B. On 18 August, he moved to fellow third division side SD Leioa, still owned by Mallorca.

On 3 July 2017, Regis signed a two-year deal with SD Eibar and was immediately assigned to CD Vitoria. He made his first team – and La Liga – debut the following 19 May, replacing goalscorer Kike in a 2–2 away draw against Atlético Madrid.

On 2 July 2019, Eibar announced the transfer of Regis to Greek club Asteras Tripolis.

References

External links

1996 births
Living people
Footballers from Palma de Mallorca
Spanish footballers
Association football forwards
La Liga players
Segunda División B players
Super League Greece players
RCD Mallorca B players
CD Llosetense players
SD Leioa players
CD Vitoria footballers
SD Eibar footballers
Asteras Tripolis F.C. players
Spanish expatriate footballers
Spanish expatriate sportspeople in Greece
Expatriate footballers in Greece